Maurice James Waldron Craig (25 October 1919 – 11 May 2011) was an Irish architectural historian, the author of several books on the architectural heritage of Ireland and other subjects, and a conservation activist.

Life 
He was born in Belfast in 1919, in a prosperous presbyterian family, though he later rejected his unionist background in favour of socialism and atheism and respect for Irish culture. He attended Castle Park School in Dalkey, Dublin, Shrewsbury School in England, Magdalene College, Cambridge, then returned to Ireland where, persuaded by poet Patrick Kavanagh, he completed a doctorate at Trinity College Dublin on the works of the early 19th-century English poet Walter Savage Landor.

Craig became active in Dublin architecture conservation in the 1940s.

From 1952, he worked in London in the Inspectorate of Ancient Monuments, but left in 1970 to join An Taisce in Dublin as its full-time executive secretary.

Craig was a prolific photographer of buildings. He donated his large collection to the Irish Architectural Archive in 2001, and anthologies of his photos have been published in book form.

Craig was married three times. His first marriage was to Beatrix Hurst, from which he had two children, and the second was to Jeanne Edwards. His third wife was actress and singer Agnes Bernelle, with whom he lived in Sandymount, Dublin, until her death in 1999.

Bibliography

His books include:
 The Volunteer Earl (1948) – a biography of James Caulfeild, 1st Earl of Charlemont
Dublin 1660–1860: The Shaping of a City (1952, 1969) – an influential work at a time of crisis for Dublin's colonial architecture
Irish Bookbindings 1600–1800 (1954) – a history of Irish bookbinding
 Ireland Observed (1970, 1980, with Desmond FitzGerald) - a survey of Irish buildings
 Classic Irish Houses of the Middle Size (1976) – a survey of 17th/18th/19th-century houses of the minor gentry
 The Architecture of Ireland from the Earliest Times to 1880 (1982)
 The Elephant and the Polish Question (1990) - a varied collection of essays
 Cats and their Poets: An Anthology (2002) - a collection of ancient and modern poems about cats
 Mausolea Hibernica (2009) - a survey of mausoleums in Ireland
 Poems - a collection of poetry
 Photographs (2011) - a collection of architectural photographs taken by Craig around Ireland

References

20th-century Irish historians
21st-century Irish historians
Alumni of Magdalene College, Cambridge
Irish architectural historians
Irish photographers
20th-century photographers
Writers from Belfast
Male non-fiction writers from Northern Ireland
20th-century Irish male writers
21st-century Irish male writers
Georgian architecture in Ireland